Us is a BBC One four-part television comedy-drama series based on the book Us by English author David Nicholls and adapted by him for the screen. The series stars Tom Hollander and Saskia Reeves as a married couple, the Petersens.

The series is directed by Geoffrey Sax and has original music composed by Oli Julian.

Synopsis
As their son, Albie, is about to leave home for university, married couple, Douglas and Connie Petersen (Tom Hollander and Saskia Reeves), have made plans to go on a "holiday of a lifetime", touring Europe. Connie, frustrated after 24 years together, tells her inhibited, orderly and risk-averse biochemist husband, Douglas, that now that Albie is leaving home, she no longer wants to stay married to him. The story follows Douglas and the family over the course of the holiday as he tries to win back the love of Connie. As their holiday progresses, the series alternates between the present day and flashbacks that show how the young Douglas (Iain De Caestecker) and Connie (Gina Bramhill) met.

Cast
 Tom Hollander as Douglas Petersen
 Saskia Reeves as Connie Petersen
 Tom Taylor as Albie Petersen
 Iain De Caestecker as young Douglas
 Gina Bramhill as young Connie
 Thaddea Graham as Kat
 Sofie Gråbøl as Freja
 Charlotte Spencer as Karen Petersen

Production
The series was filmed between July and October 2019.

Compared with the novel there was a reduction in the overall number of destinations due to  budgetary and logistical reasons. Even so four crews were employed with over 162 sets with filming undertaken in London, Buckinghamshire, Paris, Amsterdam, Venice, and Barcelona. For economic reasons many train scenes were filmed in real time on real trains.

The series first aired on the BBC in September 2020.

Reception
The review aggregator website Rotten Tomatoes reported an approval rating of 93% based on 15 reviews, with an average rating of 7.01/10.
Metacritic, which uses a weighted average, assigned a score of 76 out of 100 based on 8 critics, indicating "generally favorable reviews".

Episodes

References

External links

Us review – divorce drama offers warmth and wanderlust.
Us review, BBC One: Tom Hollander shines in this funny and acutely observed Sunday night drama.

BBC television dramas
2020s British comedy-drama television series
2020 British television series debuts
2020 British television series endings
British comedy-drama television shows
2020s British LGBT-related comedy television series
Television series about families
Television shows based on British novels
Television shows filmed in France
Television shows filmed in the Netherlands
Television shows filmed in Italy
Television shows set in Paris
Television shows set in Amsterdam
Television shows set in Venice
Television shows set in Barcelona